Xincheng Subdistrict may refers to the following places:

 Xingcheng Subdistrict, Beijing, a current subdistrict located in Fangshan District of Beijing;
 Xingcheng Subdistrict, Changsha, a past subdistrict located in Wangcheng District of Changsha, Hunan.